Al-Namas is a governorate in 'Asir Province, Saudi Arabia about  north of Abha. Al-Namas is a famous hill station located on Sarawat Mountains. Al-Namas is a window to Arab culture and traditions which date back to pre-Islamic period. it is the main home of four Arabian Azd tribes ; Shahr, Amr, Samr, and Hamr.
Al- Namas is one of the main shopping areas located on the way to Taif and Abha. It has three malls and a range of shopping area. Recently, it came to light for its expansion and planning for a big city. Recently, the city has developed a beautiful walking track for local population and tourists. The track offers great natural view and lots of things to do.

Climate

Al-Namas is slightly wetter than Abha, with about  higher average monthly rainfall during February to April and about  lower monthly rainfall during September and October.

Education
The Al-Namas Branch of Bisha University includes a Community College, a College of Arts & Sciences for male students and another for girls, and a College of Health Sciences for Girls. Al-Namas also has a technical college which offers vocational training for boys.

Politics
After student protests over conditions at the Abha campus of King Khalid University on 6 and 7 March 2012 and a follow-up sit-in on 10 March calling for the head of the university to resign, protests also occurred in the al-Namas campus of the university.

Places to visit

Shaf Alwaleed: A park with facilities for families and children. Many people visit Alanams.

Namas Museum: A good museum with many ancient things to see. It is in Abu Bakar Alsadeeq. From the highest peak of the museum, the Mujaridah valley can be seen. There is good panorama. 

Khazra: This valley is 5 km from Alnamas and is known for its natural beauty and greenery.

Fara: A beautiful village in the east of Al-Namas. It is surrounded by mountains and rivers. It has greenery and a place to enjoy Arab culture.

References

External links
 https://web.archive.org/web/20120316085341/http://alnamas.net/vb/

Populated places in 'Asir Province
Governorates of Saudi Arabia